Bădila may refer to several villages in Romania:

 Bădila, a village in Valea Iașului Commune, Argeș County
 Bădila, a village in Pârscov Commune, Buzău County

See also 
 Badea (disambiguation)
 Bădeni (disambiguation)
 Bădești (disambiguation)
 Bădescu (surname)